Michael de la Pole, 3rd Earl of Suffolk (139425 October 1415) was an English nobleman, the eldest son of Michael de la Pole, 2nd Earl of Suffolk and Katherine de Stafford.

He brought 20 men-at-arms and 60 archers to France in 1415, in company with his father, who died at the Siege of Harfleur. Michael thus succeeded to his title, but enjoyed it only briefly as he was killed seven weeks later at the Battle of Agincourt, one of the few important English casualties of the battle.

Michael de la Pole married before November 1403 Elizabeth Mowbray, daughter of the 1st Duke of Norfolk, but left no sons, only daughters:
Catherine de la Pole (born 6 May 1410), nun at Bruisyard
Elizabeth de la Pole (22 July 1411before 1422)
Isabel de la Pole (4 June 1415before 1422)

He was succeeded by his brother William de la Pole.  Tradition holds that Michael was buried at either Butley Priory in Suffolk of which he held the advowson, or the Church of St Mary the Virgin in Ewelme, Oxfordshire.

See also

James Howard, 3rd Earl of Suffolk

References

1394 births
1415 deaths
Michael
People of the Hundred Years' War
English military personnel killed in action